Short of Love ( is a 2009 Hong Kong comedy-romance film directed by James Yuen.

Plot
Wong Cho-Lam stars as Jack Lam, a self-employed stock trader who keeps his fortune amidst the 2008 financial tsunami, but loses his gold-digging girlfriend Lily (bikini model Chrissie Chau). Now without a main squeeze, Jack meets the helpful and super-cute Angel (Angelababy), who advises him that he should learn to help others instead of just helping himself. The idea is that a revamped, selfless outlook on life will lead Jack to newfound success with love.

Jack agrees to become a good guy, whereupon his life does a 180 and he's showered with opportunities for love, Jack does get plenty of chances with the ladies, but everything seems to happen arbitrarily and not necessarily because he turns over a new leaf....

Cast
 Wong Cho-lam - Jack Lam
 Kate Tsui - Scar Sandy
 Race Wong - Christy
 JJ Jia - Caca
 Angelababy - Angel
 Chrissie Chau - Lily
 Lee Man-kwan
 Ella Koon - Jack's Secretary
 Louis Cheung - Dr. Fung
 Lynn Hung - Tall Woman
 Cutie Mui - Blind Foot Massager
 Eddie Ng
 I Love You Boyz - Night Club Security Guards
 Louis Yuen - Wah Dee (Spoof of Andy Lau)

External links
 
 Short of Love at the Hong Kong Movie Database
 Short of Love at the Hong Kong Cinemagic

2009 romantic comedy films
2000s Cantonese-language films
2009 films
Films with screenplays by James Yuen
Films directed by James Yuen
Hong Kong romantic comedy films
2000s Hong Kong films